Erik Guay (born August 5, 1981) is a Canadian former World Cup alpine ski racer. Racing out of Mont-Tremblant, Quebec, Guay won the World Cup season title in super-G in 2010 and was the world champion in downhill in 2011, as well as in the super-G in 2017. With 25 World Cup podiums, he is the career leader for Canada.

Career
Born in Montreal, Guay was five when he competed in his first ski race, and when he was twelve his father, himself a ski team coach, took him for professional coaching.

His first podium came in November 2003, when he finished 2nd in a downhill at Lake Louise.  He finished in second twice in 2005 in the super-G and third once in downhill. Guay suffered an injury two weeks before the 2006 Winter Olympics, and withdrew from the downhill but finished in fourth place in the super-G, missing the podium by a tenth of a second.

He won his first World Cup race the following season at Garmisch, Germany. He was the first Canadian to win a World Cup men's downhill race since 1994, and the first man ever from Québec. Guay's performance in alpine skiing over the 2007 season was enough to place him in third position in the final world cup standings. In 2009, Guay achieved ten top-20 finishes in World Cup speed events but reached only one podium, a third.

The 2010 Winter Olympics took place on home soil for Guay and he competed in three  events in Whistler, where he narrowly missed the podium finishing in fifth place twice. Following the games, he achieved three straight podiums during March, including wins in the last two super-G races of the season, which enabled him to come from behind to win the discipline trophy in super-G in 2010 Alpine Skiing World Cup.  Guay became the first Canadian man to win a crystal globe for a discipline title since Steve Podborski in 1982.

Guay struggled with knee issues during the 2011 season, forcing him to miss events at both Kitzbühel and Wengen.  During the 2011 World Championships at Garmisch, Guay won the downhill after not finishing the super-G earlier in the week.  The win was Guay's only World Championship medal, and the second consecutive Canadian to win the world title in downhill, following John Kucera in 2009.

Guay continued to find the podium during the 2014 season. His victory at  Val Gardena in December was his fourth and the twentieth World Cup podium of his career, tying him with Steve Podborski as Canada's all-time leader. A week later he took third at Bormio to take the career lead. This boosted Guay's hopes of achieving his dream of winning an Olympic medal. Going into Sochi, Guay stated, "I won't be satisfied if I don't walk away with a medal." An injury though threatened his ability to perform at his peak after suffering a slight meniscus tear earlier in January. He finished tenth in the downhill and missed a late gate in the super-G and was disqualified. The following week, he won a downhill at Kvitfjell, Norway. Guay missed all of the 2015 season recovering from his sixth knee surgery.

At the 2017 World Championships in St. Moritz, Guay won the super-G event. At 35, Guay became the oldest World Champion ever, replacing incumbent super-G champion Hannes Reichelt. That weekend, Guay also placed second in the downhill event.

Guay was unable to participate in the alpine skiing events at the 2018 Winter Olympics in Pyeongchang because of a back injury.

Hours before Guay was supposed to compete at Lake Louise in November 2018, he decided to retire from the sport after his teammate Manuel Osborne-Paradis suffered a violent crash. He had already planned to retire after the end of the season but hastened his departure after hearing that Osborne-Paradis had needed an emergency airlift.

Personal life
Guay and his wife Karen have four daughters  and they live in Mont-Tremblant.

He is of Norwegian descent through one grandmother.
Since 2009, Erik Guay has been part of the Tremblant athletes ambassadors program.

World Cup results

Season titles

Season standings

Race podiums
5 wins – (3 DH, 2 SG)
25 podiums – (17 DH, 7 SG)

World Championship results

|}

References

External links

Erik Guay World Cup standings at the International Ski Federation

Alpine Canada.org – national ski team – athletes – Erik Guay
Head Skis – athletes – Erik Guay

1981 births
Living people
Canadian male alpine skiers
Skiers from Montreal
Alpine skiers at the 2006 Winter Olympics
Alpine skiers at the 2010 Winter Olympics
Alpine skiers at the 2014 Winter Olympics
Olympic alpine skiers of Canada
FIS Alpine Ski World Cup champions
Canadian people of Norwegian descent